The Peace and Justice Congress (PJC) is a South African political party that contested the South African 2004 general election, as well as in the Free State and Western Cape provinces for the South African 2009 provincial elections.

Election results

National elections

|----- bgcolor="#cccccc"
!Election
!Votes
!%
!Seats
|-
| 2004
| align="right" | 15,187 
| align="right" | 0.10
| align="right" | 0
|-
|}

Provincial elections

!rowspan=2|Election
!colspan=2|Eastern Cape
!colspan=2|Free State
!colspan=2|Gauteng
!colspan=2|Kwazulu-Natal
!colspan=2|Limpopo
!colspan=2|Mpumalanga
!colspan=2|North-West
!colspan=2|Northern Cape
!colspan=2|Western Cape
|- 
!%!!Seats
!%!!Seats
!%!!Seats
!%!!Seats
!%!!Seats
!%!!Seats
!%!!Seats
!%!!Seats
!%!!Seats
|-
!2004
| -||0/63
| -||0/30
| 0.09%||0/73
| -||0/80
| -||0/49
| -||0/30
| -||0/33
| -||0/30
|0.21%||0/42
|-
!2009
| -||0/63
|0.04%||0/30
| -||0/73
| -||0/80
| -||0/49
| -||0/30
| -||0/33
| -||0/30
|0.03%||0/42
|}

See also
Capital punishment

References

External links
Peace and Justice Congress

Political parties in South Africa